"The Buddha of Suburbia" is the theme song to the BBC TV series of the same name, released by David Bowie in November 1993. It was re-recorded with Lenny Kravitz for Bowie's album, also titled The Buddha of Suburbia, and inspired by his musical score for the series. The single reached No. 35 in the UK singles chart.

Background 
One of the few tracks from the series that was actually retained unchanged for the album, its nostalgic lyrics were matched by a sound that was something of a pastiche of Bowie's past work, while retaining a fresh sound. Two places in the song there are references to older Bowie songs, the guitar break from "Space Oddity" and the line "Zane, zane, zane, ouvre le chien" from "All the Madmen".

Confusingly, several different versions of the song were released, some with no differentiation in title.

Album track No. 1 ("Buddha of Suburbia") does not feature Lenny Kravitz.  Album track No. 10 does feature him, but is not titled any differently from album track No. 1, although he is credited in the liner notes.

CD single track No. 4 is labelled "Buddha of Suburbia (Rock Mix)", but it is the same as album track No. 10.  Single track No. 1 is labelled just "Buddha of Suburbia" but does show "featuring Lenny Kravitz on guitar" in the credits.  A careful comparison shows that this track is primarily the same as album track No. 1, but has the ending section of album track No. 10 (featuring Lenny Kravitz) instead of the original ending from album track No. 1.

To add additional confusion, a couple of seconds of "noise" appear at the end of Track No. 1 on the album version.  It doesn't appear on the end of the song on any of the single versions of it and the 2007 remaster/reissue of the album moves it to the beginning of Track No. 2 instead.

This single was promoted by a video featuring Bowie performing the song while strolling around an English suburb, intercut with scenes from the series.

Controversy 
The song caused minor controversies on both sides of the Atlantic, with Radio 1 making an airplay edit to cover up the word "bullshit" in the lyric, and US networks re-edited the video to remove shots where Bowie was smoking a cigarette.

Critical reception 
Alan Jones from Music Week wrote, "The TV series is based in the Seventies, and Bowie's title song is evocative of both the period and his work from then. Its unusual lyrics may cause problems on radio, but it's still commercial and compelling."

Track listing
All tracks written by David Bowie.

7" vinyl single 

 UK, Germany, Netherlands: Arista-BMG / 74321 17705 7

Cassette single 

 UK, Germany, Netherlands: Arista-BMG / 74321 17705 4

CD single 

 UK, Germany, Netherlands: Arista-BMG / 74321 17705 2

Collectors edition CD single 
Collectors edition with a holographic CD.

 UK: Arista-BMG / 74321 18168 2

Personnel 
David Bowie – vocals, keyboards, guitar, synthesizers, saxophone, production
Lenny Kravitz – guitar on "The Buddha of Suburbia"
Erdal Kızılçay – bass, drums, keyboards, percussion, trumpet
David Richards – production

References

Further reading 
 Pegg, Nicholas, The Complete David Bowie, Reynolds & Hearn Ltd, 2000, 

1993 singles
David Bowie songs
Television drama theme songs
Songs written by David Bowie
Song recordings produced by David Bowie
Arista Records singles
Buddhism in music
1993 songs